The Church of St Luke and St Andrew in Priston, Somerset, England has a nave dating from the 12th century, on the site of an earlier Norman church. It has been designated as a Grade I listed building.

The arches under the central tower include original stonework from the Norman era, but were rebuilt in 1859, with the chancel being restored 10 years later under Sir George Gilbert Scott.

The tower dates from the 15th century and is crowned with a disproportionately large weather vane given as a gift by the lord of the manor in 1813.

The interior includes a 14th-century octagonal font.

The parish is part of the benefice of Timsbury with Priston, Camerton and Dunkerton within the Diocese of Bath and Wells.

See also

 List of Grade I listed buildings in Bath and North East Somerset
 List of towers in Somerset
 List of ecclesiastical parishes in the Diocese of Bath and Wells

References

External links 

Official Priston Church Webpage

12th-century church buildings in England
Towers completed in the 15th century
Grade I listed churches in Somerset
Church of England church buildings in Bath and North East Somerset
Grade I listed buildings in Bath and North East Somerset